Fifty-five species of butterflies have been officially recorded in Dominica, an island-nation in the Caribbean Lesser Antilles.

Two species are endemic to Dominica: the Dominican hairstreak (Electrostrymon dominicana) and the Dominican snout (Libytheana fulvescens). An additional seven species are endemic to the Lesser Antilles: Godman's hairstreak (Allosmaitia piplea), bronze hairstreak (Electrostrymon angerona), Godman's leaf (Memphis dominicana), St Lucia mestra (Mestra cana), lesser whirlabout (Polites dictynna), broken dash skipper (Wallengrenia ophites), and the stub-tailed skipper (Urbanus obscurus).

Hesperiidae - skippers

Subfamily Pyrginae
Jung's dusky wing (Achlyodes mithridates)
Zestos skipper (Epargyreus zestos)
Hairy dusky wing (Ephyriades arcas)
Jamaican dusky wing (Ephyriades brunnea)

Subfamily Eudaminae
Roy's skipper (Astraptes anaphus)
Hammock skipper (Polygonus leo)
Manuel's skipper (Polygonus manueli)
Mercury skipper (Proteides mercurius)
Stub-tailed skipper (Urbanus obscurus) (Lesser Antillean endemic)
Common long-tail skipper (Urbanus proteus)

Subfamily Hesperiinae
Canna skipper (Calpodes ethlius)
Fiery skipper (Hylephila phyleus)
Nyctelius skipper (Nyctelius nyctelius)
Sugar cane skipper (Panoquina sylvicola)
Lesser whirlabout (Polites dictynna) (Lesser Antillean endemic)
Tropical chequered skipper (Pyrgus oileus)
Broken dash skipper (Wallengrenia ophites) (Lesser Antillean endemic)

Libytheidae - snout butterflies

Subfamily Libytheinae
Dominican snout (Libytheana fulvescens) (Dominican endemic)

Lycaenidae - blues and hairstreaks

Subfamily Theclinae
St. Peter's hairstreak (Allosmaitia coelebs)
Godman's hairstreak (Allosmaitia piplea) (Lesser Antillean endemic)
Clench's hairstreak (Chlorostrymon maesites)
St. Christopher's hairstreak (Chlorostrymon simaethis)
Bronze hairstreak (Electrostrymon angerona) (Lesser Antillean endemic)
Dominican hairstreak (Electrostrymon dominicana) (Dominican endemic)
Drury's hairstreak (Strymon acis)
Bubastus hairstreak (Strymon bubastus)
Hewitson's hairstreak (Strymon columella)

Subfamily Polyommatinae
Hanno blue (Hemiargus hanno)
Cassius blue (Leptotes cassius)

Nymphalidae - fritillaries

Subfamily Charaxinae
Godman's leaf (Memphis dominicana) (Lesser Antillean endemic)

Subfamily Cyrestinae
Southern dagger tail (Marpesia petreus)

Subfamily Danainae
Monarch (Danaus plexippus)

Subfamily Heliconiinae
Gulf fritillary (Agraulis vanillae)
Silver spot (Dione juno)
Julia butterfly (Dryas iulia)
Zebra butterfly (Heliconius charithonia)

Subfamily Limenitidinae
Red rim (Biblis hyperia)
Orion cecropian (Historis odius)
St Lucia mestra (Mestra cana) (Lesser Antillean endemic)

Subfamily Nymphalinae
White peacock (Anartia jatrophae)
Mimic (Hypolimnas misippus)
Caribbean buckeye (Junonia evarete)
Painted lady (Vanessa cardui)

Papilionidae - swallowtails

Subfamily Papilioninae
Polydamas swallowtail (Battus polydamas)

Pieridae - whites and sulphurs

Subfamily Pierinae
Migrant sulphur (Aphrissa statira)
Florida white (Appias drusilla)
Great southern white (Ascia monuste)

Subfamily Coliadinae
Barred sulphur (Eurema daira)
False barred sulphur (Eurema elathea)
Hall's sulphur (Eurema leuce)
Little sulphur (Eurema lisa)
Little yellow (Eurema venusta)
Large orange sulphur (Phoebis agarithe)
Cloudless sulphur (Phoebis sennae)
Straight-line sulphur (Rhabdodryas trite or Phoebis trite)

Disputed and unconfirmed
Florida leafwing (Anaea troglodyta.) Evans & James (1997) considered the record of this species questionable.
Unidentified Heliconius sp., noted by Evans & James (1997) to have been sighted on two occasions at the edge of dry forest.

References

Butterflies
Dominica
Butterflies
Dominica
Dominica